Pir Mikail (also Romanized as Pīr Mīkā’īl; also known as Pīr Mekā’īl) is a village in the Kani Bazar Rural District, Khalifan District, Mahabad County, West Azerbaijan Province, Iran. As of the 2006 census, its population was 111, in 17 families.

References 

Populated places in Mahabad County